Hatchards claims to be the oldest bookshop in the United Kingdom, founded on Piccadilly in 1797 by John Hatchard. After one move, it has been at the same location on Piccadilly next to Fortnum & Mason since 1801, and the two stores are also neighbours in St. Pancras railway station as of 2014. It has a reputation for attracting high-profile authors and holds three Royal Warrants granted by the Queen, the Prince of Wales and the Duke of Edinburgh respectively.

History

The oldest bookshop in the United Kingdom, Hatchards was founded at 173 Piccadilly, London, by John Hatchard in 1797. It moved within Piccadilly in 1801, to No.189–190; the site of the first shop was cleared in 1810 for the Egyptian Hall to be built. The second shop had a numbering change to 187, in 1820. It still trades today from the same address, and Hatchard's portrait can be seen on the staircase of the shop.

It was founded with a collection of merchandise bought from Simon Vandenbergh, a bookseller of the 18th century.

In 1939 Hatchards was acquired for £6,000 by convicted fraudster Clarence Hatry, on his release from prison. He turned the ailing business around, and in 1946 he also acquired the T. Werner Laurie Ltd. publishing firm.

Hatchards was acquired by William Collins, Sons in 1956. In the 1980s it expanded the number of its retail outlets, opening branches across the UK. It was bought by Pentos in 1990, and Pentos was later acquired by Waterstone's who rebranded all but the flagship store.

Operations
It has a reputation for attracting high-profile authors and holds three Royal Warrants. Oscar Wilde’s favourite bookshop, the writer signed his books sitting at the ground floor main table – today known as Oscar's table.

Hatchards opened a new store in St Pancras railway station in 2014. The 2,000 sq ft store, opened at the beginning of August, and was located next door to a new (2013) branch of Fortnum and Mason, continuing a relationship that goes back over two centuries. In August 2019 this location re-opened in a larger space within the station.

Gallery

References

Further reading
Humphreys, Arthur L. (1893) Piccadilly Bookmen: memorials of the house of Hatchard. London: Hatchards
Laver, James (1947) Hatchards of Piccadilly, 1797-1947: one hundred and fifty years of bookselling. London: Hatchards
Hatchards: 1797-1997. London: Hatchards, 1997
Hatchards, Piccadilly, St Pancras: Celebrating 220 Years of Bookselling; booksellers since 1797; [compiled by Jane McMorland Hunter and Sam Hubbard]. London: Hatchards, 2017

External links

Bookshops in London
Retail companies established in 1797
Buildings and structures in the City of Westminster
British Royal Warrant holders
Tourist attractions in the City of Westminster
Piccadilly
Companies based in the City of Westminster
British companies established in 1797
Bookstores established in the 18th century